Ultima: Worlds of Adventure 2: Martian Dreams is a role-playing video game, part of the Ultima series, published in 1991, and re-released for Windows and Mac OS via GOG.com in 2012.  It uses the same engine as Ultima VI: The False Prophet, as did Worlds of Ultima: The Savage Empire.

Story
After the events in the Worlds of Ultima: The Savage Empire, the Avatar is visited by a strange red-haired woman who gives a book to him and his friend Dr. Spector. The book will be written by Spector himself, and explains how to use the Orb of the Moons to travel through time. Following instructions, the duo ends up in the Victorian Era, where Percival Lowell has set up a space cannon that will launch some volunteers to Mars.

Through an act of sabotage, the cannon is fired during the 1893 World's Columbian Exposition in Chicago, with several dozen famous people and leaders of the time on board. A second cannon is prepared to find and recover the people in the first, who are stranded on Mars.

It turns out that Mars had an extensive civilization based on plants. Most monsters the player encounters are so-called "plantimals", such as the Jumping Bean and the Planther. Mars has cities and canals, although the civilization is in ruins, so the player's first tasks are restoring the world power station, and melting enough of the polar caps (with a solar lens) to fill the canals.

Some of the people appear to have gone insane after using a device called the Dream Machine. What in fact happened was that, after massive soil poisoning, the original Martians had gone into a sort of alternate dimension called "dreamspace" to preserve themselves. Those people using the Dream Machine found themselves trapped in dreamspace, while the Martians took over their bodies. A large part of the game is spent visiting various people's nightmares and clearing them up.

Eventually, robotic bodies can be created for the Martians, since their plantamal bodies will not grow. After a showdown with the evil Raxachk, who caused the soil pollution in the first place, all Victorians can once more go home.

Reception
Computer Gaming Worlds Scorpia in 1991 liked Martian Dreamss Victorian setting, but criticized travel as "tedious". The magazine stated that the game was really an adventure pretending to be an RPG, with combat almost completely disassociated from the story, and concluded that it would most appeal to those who prefer other activities to fighting. Peter Olafson was more positive, calling it "an epic adventure ... that has all the depth and complexity of the Ultima series" while accessible to new adventurers. A review by Scorpia in 1993 was also positive, approving of the storyline. She concluded that "the game requires patience and careful attention to detail, but is otherwise enjoyable".

References

External links

GOG.com now offers an official free download of this game

Role-playing video games
DOS games
Classic Mac OS games
Single-player video games
Steampunk video games
Worlds of Adventure 2: Martian Dreams
Video game sequels
Video games featuring protagonists of selectable gender
Video games set on Mars
Video games with oblique graphics
Windows games
1991 video games
Games commercially released with DOSBox
Cultural depictions of Calamity Jane
Cultural depictions of Grigori Rasputin
Cultural depictions of Sigmund Freud
Video games developed in the United States
Video games scored by Dana Karl Glover
Video games scored by George Sanger
Video games produced by Warren Spector